UHO may refer to:

United Homeless Organization
 Haluoleo University (Universitas Haluoleo), a university in Indonesia
University of Holguín (Universidad de Holguín), a university in Cuba
 Uho, the symbol for the chemical element Unhexoctium